STJ may refer to:

St. John's International School (disambiguation)
St. John's University (New York)
Superconducting tunnel junction
Severn Tunnel Junction railway station, Wales; National Rail station code STJ
Superior Tribunal de Justiça, the highest court in Brazil